The Royal Melillan Football Federation (RFMF) is responsible for administering football in the Autonomous City of Melilla. They are not directly affiliated with FIFA or CAF or UEFA. Till now there has been no attempt to select a team to represent the whole Spanish exclave in North Africa. Only under 14 and under 18 years teams have played so far, against other autonomous entities of Spain.

References

External links
Official site of Melilla Football Federation
Territorial Federations in Spain

Football Federation
Mellila
Sports organizations established in 1999
1999 establishments in Spain
Organisations based in Spain with royal patronage